Angelo Bonomelli is an Italian-Costa Rican surfer, born in Varese, Italy in 1991. He was part of the Volcom Europe surf team for years, and was coached by surfing legend Didier Piter. Bonomelli was the first Italian surfer to get good results in the ASP Pro Junior and QS.

Bonomelli is one of the best-known Italian surfers, together with Leonardo Fioravanti.

Career Best Results

 4th, ISA European Championships, Marrock 2009
 1st, Analog Challenge 2009
 2009 Italian Champion
 3rd, Croyde Salt Rock Open, 2010
 2nd, Croyde Salt Rock Pro Junior, 2010
 1st, Analog Challenge, 2010
 12th, European Pro Junior ranking, 2011
 5th, Alas Latin Tour, Costa Rica, 2011
 5th, Somo Pro Junior 2011
 5th, Canary Island Pro Junior 
 2011, Semifinals, Lacanau Pro Junior, 2011
 1st, Somo Quiksilver Open, 2012 
 1st, Versilia Surf Trophy, 2012
 Semifinal, Reperchage Eurosurf, Azores, 2013
 1st, Somo Quiksilver Open Contest, 2013 
 1st, X-Turan Surf Contest, 2013

References

External links
 Official Facebook Page

Italian surfers
Sportspeople from Varese
1991 births
Living people